Ferri Ridge is a gentle ridge in Antarctica, forming the west wall of Simmons Glacier. It terminates in Mount Isherwood at the north side of the Kohler Range, Marie Byrd Land. It was mapped by the United States Geological Survey from ground surveys and U.S. Navy air photos, 1959–66, and was named by the Advisory Committee on Antarctic Names for Guy Ferri of the U.S. Department of State, Chairman of the Interagency Committee on Antarctica, 1969–70.

References 

Ridges of Marie Byrd Land